Amphipoea senilis is a species of cutworm or dart moth in the family Noctuidae. It was first described by Smith in 1892 and it is found in North America.

The MONA or Hodges number for Amphipoea senilis is 9459.

References

Further reading

 
 
 
 
 
 
 
 
 
 

Apameini
Moths described in 1892